Xeromphalina cornui is a species of agaric fungus in the family Mycenaceae. It was originally described in 1866 by French mycologist Lucien Quélet as Omphalia cornui; Swiss naturalist   Jules Favre transferred it to Xeromphalina in 1936.

References

External links

Fungi described in 1877
Fungi of Europe
Fungi of North America
Mycenaceae